John Arthur Bolton (born 22 June 1945) is a former weightlifter for New Zealand. He won two silver medals representing New Zealand at British Commonwealth Games.

He won the silver medal at the 1974 British Commonwealth Games in the men's under 82.5 kg. Four years later at the 1974 British Commonwealth Games he won the silver medal in the men's 110 kg grade.

He represented New Zealand at two Olympic Games, at the 1968 Mexico Olympics and at the 1972 Munich Olympics. His best result was 16th place in the light-heavyweight grade at the 1968 Olympics.

He currently works as a real estate agent in Manukau, Auckland.

References

1945 births
New Zealand male weightlifters
Olympic weightlifters of New Zealand
Weightlifters at the 1968 Summer Olympics
Weightlifters at the 1972 Summer Olympics
Commonwealth Games silver medallists for New Zealand
Weightlifters at the 1966 British Empire and Commonwealth Games
Weightlifters at the 1970 British Commonwealth Games
Weightlifters at the 1974 British Commonwealth Games
Living people
New Zealand real estate agents
Commonwealth Games medallists in weightlifting
20th-century New Zealand people
21st-century New Zealand people
Medallists at the 1970 British Commonwealth Games
Medallists at the 1974 British Commonwealth Games